The vice president of the Republic of Bulgaria is a position, established by the Constitution of Bulgaria, and the only active vice presidential office in the European Union (EU).

The vice president is elected in a popular vote, along with the president. Candidates for president and vice president run on their party ticket and are prohibited from serving in any other post upon election.

According to the constitution the vice president shall be principal assistant to the president in his/her official duties.

In the 1971–1990 period, the Chairmen of the State Council — Todor Zhivkov (1971–1989) and Petar Mladenov (1989–1990) — were the heads of state of Bulgaria. The First Deputy Chairmen of the State Council were deputy heads of state. The State Council was abolished on April 3, 1990.

Below is a list of first deputy chairmen of the State Council and vice-presidents of the Republic of Bulgaria:

First deputy chairmen of the State Council of Bulgaria, 1971–1990

Vice President, 1990–present

Elected by parliament, 1990–1992 
The following vice presidents were elected by the parliament.

Directly elected, 1992–present 
The following vice-presidents were elected by the people.

See also
 History of Bulgaria
 Politics of Bulgaria
 List of first deputy chairmen of the State Council of Bulgaria
 List of heads of state of Bulgaria
 List of current vice presidents

Notes

References

Vice Presidents of Bulgaria
Bulgaria
1990 establishments in Bulgaria